Partson Jaure (born July 8, 1990) is a Zimbabwean professional footballer, who plays as a defender for Zimbabwe national team. On club level, he is currently a free agent following his release from the University of Pretoria.

Career

Club
Dynamos were Jaure's first club, he began in the youth team before being promoted into the first-team. During his four years with Dynamos he won six trophies, including three Zimbabwe Premier Soccer League titles in a row. 2014 saw Jaure leave Zimbabwe for South Africa as he agreed to join the University of Pretoria. He made 24 league appearances in both his first and his second seasons with the club, including scoring a goal in November 2014 versus Moroka Swallows. At the end of his second season with Tuks the club were relegated via the 2015–16 play-offs and Jaure was subsequently released at the end of the season. In March 2020, Jaure got an accident

International
Jaure's Zimbabwe debut came in a 2014 FIFA World Cup qualifier against Egypt on 26 March 2013. He made a total of three appearances in Zimbabwe's unsuccessful World Cup qualifying campaign. In January 2014, coach Ian Gorowa, invited him to be a part of the Zimbabwe squad for the 2014 African Nations Championship. He helped the team to a fourth-place finish after being defeated by Nigeria by a goal to nil. He made a total of six appearances in the competition.

Career statistics

Club
.

International
.

International goals
Scores and results list Zimbabwe's goal tally first.

Honours

Club
Dynamos (2020-)
Zimbabwean Independence Trophy (1): 2010
Zimbabwe Premier Soccer League (3): 2011, 2012, 2013
Mbada Diamonds Cup (2): 2011, 2012

References

External links
 

Living people
Zimbabwean footballers
Zimbabwean expatriate footballers
Zimbabwe A' international footballers
2014 African Nations Championship players
1990 births
Place of birth missing (living people)
Association football defenders
Dynamos F.C. players
University of Pretoria F.C. players
Ngezi Platinum F.C. players
Buildcon F.C. players
Manica Diamonds F.C. players
Zimbabwe international footballers
Zimbabwean expatriate sportspeople in South Africa
Zimbabwean expatriate sportspeople in Zambia
Expatriate soccer players in South Africa
Expatriate footballers in Zambia
2020 African Nations Championship players